Water Rustlers is a 1939 American Western film directed by Samuel Diege. It was the first of three Dorothy Page singing cowgirl films for Grand National Films.

Plot
Mr. Weylan purchases land in order to keep the water supply for himself, originally for hydraulic mining. His long term scheme is when all the ranches fail due to their cattle having no water, he can buy their land cheaply and sell it to a meat company.

Weylan gets his way through fair means, such as having his lawyers getting the rancher's case thrown out of court, as well as foul means such as his henchmen murdering Shirley Martin's father and preventing witnesses to testify.  Shirley takes the law into her own hands to lead the ranchers in their fight for justice.

Cast 
 Dorothy Page as Shirley Martin
 Dave O'Brien as Bob Lawson
 Vince Barnett as Mike, the cook
 Stanley Price as Robert Weylan
 Ethan Allen as Tim Martin
 Leonard Trainor as Andy Jurgens, rancher
 Warner Richmond as Wiley, crooked foreman
 Edward R. Gordon as Henchman Herman
 Edward Peil Sr. as Lawyer
 Lloyd Ingraham as Judge
 Merrill McCormick as Sheriff

Production
Grand National Pictures lost their top singing cowboy star Tex Ritter to Monogram Pictures. In what was planned to be a series of six musicals, Page filmed three films with a shooting time of five days each from August to October 1938. All were directed by Samuel Diege who died of a heart attack in October 1939.

Soundtrack 
 Dorothy Page -"Let's Go On Like This Forever" (Written by Al Sherman)
 Dorothy Page - "When a Cowboy Sings a Dogie Lullaby" (Written by Walter Kent)
 Dorothy Page - "I Feel at Home in the Saddle" (Written by Milton Drake)

Notes

External links 
 
 

1939 films
1939 Western (genre) films
American black-and-white films
Grand National Films films
American Western (genre) films
1930s English-language films
1930s American films